Denham railway station is a railway station in the village of Denham in Buckinghamshire, England.

History

The station was built just north of Denham village as part of the Great Western and Great Central Joint Railway. It opened on 2 April 1906 as Denham for Harefield.

The original station layout had four roads: two for non-stop trains, and two with platforms for stopping services. There was a small goods yard north of the line, and a signal box at the London end of the "down" platform. The two through roads have been removed, being taken up in December 1965, with all services using the platform roads and has since had improved track alignments to allow fast running trains. The signal box closed on 15 June 1975. The former goods yard is now the station car park.

The station was transferred from the Western Region of British Rail to the London Midland Region on 24 March 1974.

Abandoned Central line extension
Under the London Passenger Transport Board's 1935-40 New Works Programme, Denham was to have been the terminus of the Central line's westward extension from North Acton, with Central line platforms south of those on the main line. The continuation to Denham was added in 1937. Work on the extension was postponed in World War II. The introduction of the Metropolitan Green Belt limited the expansion of the London urban area and the extension beyond West Ruislip was cancelled. No visible signs of the extension works remain at Denham.

Development
The station was built with a pedestrian underpass linking the platforms, but this was inaccessible to people with impaired mobility. Further, the embankment supporting the "down" (westbound) platform and buildings was subsiding, so the "down" platform has been relocated as an island north of the "down" road, in the gap left by the removal of the original through roads, and to provide a footbridge and lifts, similar to those at Gerrards Cross, for disabled access. The new "down" platform was opened for use in late July 2008, and the original "down" platform and buildings have been removed.

A proposed second phase, providing a third reversible track between the rear of the new platform and the existing "up" (eastbound) platform road, would improve operational flexibility by allowing stopping services to be passed by following non-stop trains.

Services
The typical Monday - Friday off-peak service consists of:

1 train per hour to 
1 train per hour to

Cultural use

Denham Station served as "New Milton station" in the 1949 British comedy '"The Chiltern Hundreds'', starring Cecil Parker and David Tomlinson.  

In the episode "Queen and Country" of season 9 of the TV series New Tricks, Denham station was the location used for an unspecified station in Exeter.

In episode 6, "Home Sweet Home", of series 2 of TV sitcom The Good Life, the Goods are dropped off by Mr May outside the main building at Denham station after viewing a smallholding.

See also

 Harefield Road tube station - a station between Denham and West Ruislip that would have been built if the Central line extension to Denham had been built.
 Acton-Northolt Line

References

External links

 www.railwayarchive.org.uk
 Denham Junction station during construction, 1903
 Denham Junction station during construction, 1903
 Construction of viaduct over River Thame, close to Denham, 1903
A History of the London Tube Maps, Map from 1939 showing future extension of the Central line to Harefield Road and Denham

Railway stations in Buckinghamshire
Former Great Western and Great Central Joint Railway stations
Railway stations in Great Britain opened in 1906
Railway stations served by Chiltern Railways
Proposed London Underground stations
Unbuilt London Underground stations
Denham, Buckinghamshire